Stizocera is a genus of beetles in the family Cerambycidae, containing the following species:

 Stizocera armata Audinet-Serville, 1834
 Stizocera armigera (White, 1853)
 Stizocera asyka Galileo & Martins, 2004
 Stizocera atiaia (Martins & Napp, 1983)
 Stizocera bisignata Zajciw, 1958
 Stizocera boyi Melzer, 1927
 Stizocera caymanensis Fisher, 1941
 Stizocera consobrina Gounelle, 1909
 Stizocera curacaoae Gilmour, 1968
 Stizocera daudini Chalumeau & Touroult, 2005
 Stizocera debilis Galileo & Martins, 2010
 Stizocera delicata Lingafelter, 2004
 Stizocera diversispinis Zajciw, 1962
 Stizocera dozieri (Fisher, 1947)
 Stizocera elegantula (Perroud, 1855)
 Stizocera evanescens Vitali, 2010
 Stizocera floridana Linsley, 1949
 Stizocera fragilis (Bates, 1870)
 Stizocera geniculata (Pascoe, 1866)
 Stizocera horni Melzer, 1923
 Stizocera howdeni Gilmour, 1963
 Stizocera ichilo Lingafelter, 2004
 Stizocera insolita Gilmour, 1968
 Stizocera insulana (Gahan, 1895)
 Stizocera jamaicensis Vitali, 2007
 Stizocera jassuara (Martins & Napp, 1983)
 Stizocera juati Martins & Napp, 1983
 Stizocera kawensis Galileo & Martins, 2009
 Stizocera laceyi Linsley, 1934
 Stizocera lissonota (Bates, 1870)
 Stizocera longicollis Zajciw, 1963
 Stizocera meinerti (Aurivillius, 1900)
 Stizocera melanura (Erichson in Schomburg, 1848)
 Stizocera mojuba Martins & Napp, 1983
 Stizocera nigroapicalis Fuchs, 1961
 Stizocera nigroflava Zajciw, 1965
 Stizocera pantonyssoides Zajciw, 1968
 Stizocera phtisica Gounelle, 1909
 Stizocera plicicollis (Germar, 1824)
 Stizocera plumbea Gounelle, 1909
 Stizocera poeyi (Guérin-Méneville, 1838)
 Stizocera punctatissima Martins, 2005
 Stizocera rugicollis (Guérin-Méneville, 1844)
 Stizocera seminigra Martins & Napp, 1983
 Stizocera spinicornis (Fairmaire, 1864)
 Stizocera sublaevigata Zajciw, 1962
 Stizocera submetallica (Chemsak & Linsley, 1968)
 Stizocera suturalis (Martins & Napp, 1992)
 Stizocera tristis (Guérin-Méneville, 1844)
 Stizocera vanzwaluwenburgi (Fisher, 1932)
 Stizocera wagneri (Gounelle, 1913)

References

 
Elaphidiini